Echinoplectanum chauvetorum is a species of diplectanid monogenean parasitic on the gills of the black-saddled coralgrouper, Plectropomus laevis. It has been described in 2006.

Etymology
Justine & Euzet wrote that the species was named “for Professor Claude Chauvet, a specialist of grouper biology, and his wife Gisèle Chauvet, who kindly provided, among many other fish, several of the fish hosts used in this study”.

Hosts and localities

The black-saddled coral grouper Plectropomus laevis is the type-host of Echinoplectanum chauvetorum. The type-locality is the coral reef off Nouméa, New Caledonia.

References

External links 

Diplectanidae
Animals described in 2006
Fauna of New Caledonia